Ágnes Sipka (born August 14, 1954) is a retired long-distance runner from Hungary, who won the 1984 edition of the Berlin Marathon on September 30, 1984, clocking 2:39:32.

Achievements

References
 ARRS

1954 births
Living people
Hungarian female long-distance runners
Hungarian female marathon runners
Berlin Marathon female winners
Place of birth missing (living people)